is a Japanese Internet media company with headquarters in the Roppongi Hills Mori Tower in Roppongi, Tokyo. It has been operating the social network service GREE since its establishment in December 2004.

History
 Feb. 2004 Release of GREE alpha to the public by Yoshikazu Tanaka as a personal hobby
 Mar. 2004 Exceeds 10,000 users
 Dec. 2004 Established GREE, Inc.
 Nov. 2006 Launches EZ GREE (now au one GREE) as a KDDI Mobile official service
 Feb. 2007 Launches GREE as a NTT Docomo official service
 Mar. 2007 Exceeds 1 million users
 Aug. 2007 Launches GREE as a Softbank official service
 Dec. 2008 Listed on the Market of the High-Growth and Emerging Stocks
 Apr. 2009 Exceeds 10 million users
 Jun. 2010 Exceeds 20 million users
 Jun. 2010 Listed on the first section of the Tokyo Stock Exchange
 Jun. 2010 Release of third-party applications on "GREE Platform"
 Jul. 2010 Relocates Company headquarters to Roppongi Hills Mori Tower, Tokyo
 Nov. 2010 Announcement of investment in Project Goth, Inc.
 Dec. 2010 Launches "GREE Platform for smartphone"
 Dec. 2010 Exceeds 23.8 million users
 Jan. 2011 Establishment of a subsidiary, GREE International, Inc. in the US
 Jan. 2011 Acquisition of Atlantis Co., Ltd.
 Jan. 2011 Announcement of business collaboration with Tencent
 Apr. 2011 Buys US social mobile gaming platform OpenFeint for $104 million 
 May 2012 GREE purchased the mobile game developer Funzio for $210 million

Origin of the name GREE
The company name GREE comes from a hypothesis, Six Degrees of Separation postulated by social psychologist Stanley Milgram in 1967. "Six degrees of separation" is a hypothesis that everyone is approximately six steps away from any other person on Earth. If a chain of "a friend of a friend" statements are made, on average, any two people in the world can be connected in six steps or fewer.
The name symbolizes GREE’s hope to "create and provide any new possibilities of the Internet" and to "create new forms of fun, convenience, and excitement."

References

External links

Mass media companies based in Tokyo
Software companies based in Tokyo
Mass media companies established in 2004
Japanese brands
Japanese companies established in 2004
Companies formerly listed on the Tokyo Stock Exchange
Internet in Japan
Internet technology companies of Japan